Chelinidea vittiger, known generally as cactus coreid, is a species of leaf-footed bug in the family Coreidae. Other common names include the squash bug and cactus bug. It is found in Australia, Central America, and North America.

References

Further reading

External links

 

Articles created by Qbugbot
Insects described in 1863
Chelinideini